Michael Posner Baxte (January 27, 1890 – 1972) was an American violinist and painter, born in Staroselje, Belarus. His work was part of the painting event in the art competition at the 1936 Summer Olympics. His wife was Algerian-born artist Violette Mège (1889–1968).

References

1890 births
1972 deaths
20th-century American painters
American male painters
Olympic competitors in art competitions
20th-century American male artists